The 1996 season was the Minnesota Vikings' 36th in the National Football League (NFL). Under head coach Dennis Green, they finished with a 9–7 record and qualified for the playoffs for the first time since 1994, starting a run of five consecutive playoff appearances.

They started the season with five wins in their first six games, before losing their next four. Starting quarterback Warren Moon suffered a broken collarbone during the season and missed the final six games, allowing fifth-year backup Brad Johnson to take his place. With Johnson under center, the Vikings won four of their remaining five games, including divisional victories on the road against the Detroit Lions and at home to the Tampa Bay Buccaneers. Those wins proved pivotal in the Vikings qualification for the playoffs, as their superior intra-conference record (8–4) over the Washington Redskins rendered Minnesota's week 17 loss to the eventual Super Bowl champion Green Bay Packers irrelevant, despite the Redskins defeating the defending Super Bowl champion Dallas Cowboys. The Vikings entered the playoffs as the number 6 seed in the NFC, pitting them against the Cowboys in the wildcard round. The Cowboys put up 30 unanswered points in the first half and ultimately won the game 40–15, making it the fourth time in five seasons that the Vikings' season ended in the wildcard round.

For the season, the Vikings sported new uniforms, adding the team's logo to both sleeves of the jersey as well as adding yellow number and yellow name outlines. These uniforms would remain in use with the Minnesota Vikings until 2005.

Offseason

1996 Draft

 The Vikings traded their fourth-round selection and the fifth-round selection they received from the New York Giants (112th and 137th overall) to the Arizona Cardinals in exchange for Arizona's fourth-round selection (97th overall).
 The Vikings traded their sixth-round selection and safety Vencie Glenn to the New York Giants in exchange for the Giants' fifth-round selection (137th overall) and 1995 sixth-round selection (189th overall).

Preseason

Regular season

Schedule

Note: Intra-division opponents are in bold text.

Standings

Postseason

Statistics

Team leaders

League rankings

Staff

Roster

References

Minnesota Vikings seasons
Minnesota
Minnesota